Team Australia may refer to:

Team Australia, a sponsored identity of Champ Car auto racing team Walker Racing;
Team Australia, an entry identity for a Superleague Formula auto racing team run by Alan Docking Racing;
A1 Team Australia, an auto racing team in that competes in A1 Grand Prix series;
The Australia international rules football team which competes annually against Ireland;
The Australian national ice hockey team, also called the Mighty Roos
Team Australia (roller derby)